Wole Oladiyun (born April 2, 1959) is a Nigerian clergyman, author, businessman, engineer and the founder/senior pastor of Christ Living Spring Apostolic Ministry (CLAM).

Early life and education
Pastor Oladiyun was born on the 2nd of April, 1959 in Ile Oluji in Ondo State, Nigeria. His parents were members of the clergy with his father an elder and his mother a deaconess at Christ Apostolic Church. He studied engineering at the University of Ife. He has an MBA from the Netherland Business School, Holland.

Career
After his graduation from the University of Ife, Pastor Oladiyun ventured into business by selling motor spare parts, chemicals and wood despite his initial desire to become a policeman.

Ministry
Pastor Oladiyun attended the Latter Rain Bible School, in Lagos.  He also passed through Deeper Life Bible Church.  At Faith Family Bible Church, Ojodu, Lagos, he submitted himself as the assistant pastor to Rev. (Dr.) D. K. Aboderin. He considers Pastor Matthew Ashimolowo as his mentor in ministry.

Personal life
Pastor Oladiyun got married in 1990 to Bukola Oladiyun (a pastor in his ministry). they have four children together with 3 grandchildren.

References

Living people
1959 births
People from Ondo State
Yoruba Christian clergy
Nigerian Christian clergy
Obafemi Awolowo University alumni
20th-century Protestant religious leaders
21st-century Protestant religious leaders
Nigerian Christian writers
Nigerian Pentecostal pastors